The Meningitis Vaccine Project is an effort to eliminate the meningitis epidemic in Sub-Saharan Africa by developing a new meningococcal vaccine.  The meningitis problem in that area is caused by a strain of meningitis called "meningitis A", which is present only in the African meningitis belt.  In June 2010 various sources announced that they had developed MenAfriVac, which is an inexpensive, safe, and highly effective vaccine which is likely to stop the epidemic as quickly as anyone had ever hoped that it would.

The project marked the first time that medical research had developed a vaccine to combat a disease which is endemic to and only a problem for Africa.

The project began in 2001 when the Bill & Melinda Gates Foundation awarded the World Health Organization and the Program for Appropriate Technology in Health (PATH) a US $70 million seed grant to begin research.

Background

In 2001, the Bill & Melinda Gates Foundation awarded the World Health Organization and the Program for Appropriate Technology in Health (PATH) a US$70 million seed grant to launch the Meningitis Vaccine Project.

Implementation
The mission of the Project is to eliminate meningitis as a public health problem in sub-Saharan Africa through the development, testing, introduction, and widespread use of conjugate meningococcal vaccines. The Project recently developed MenAfriVac, a low-cost conjugate A vaccine that is ready for widespread distribution to people between the ages of 1 and 29 in Burkina Faso, Mali, and Niger, three countries in the African meningitis belt with the highest rates of meningitis.

Manufacture
By working with the Serum Institute of India Ltd. to manufacture the vaccine, the Project was able to develop a vaccine that would be affordable to developing African countries, priced at less than $US.50 per dose. Unlike existing vaccines, MenAfriVac also provides immunity for a long period of time—10 to 15 years—and is safe for use in infants one year of age and older. Following successful trials, the vaccine was introduced in three African countries in 2010.

See also 
 African meningitis belt
 2009–10 West African meningitis outbreak
 Meningococcal vaccine

Sources

External links
 
 PATH project page

Bill & Melinda Gates Foundation
Meningitis
Vaccination-related organizations